Hilde Sperling defeated Simonne Mathieu 6–2, 6–1 in the final to win the women's singles tennis title at the 1935 French Championships.

Seeds
The seeded players are listed below. Hilde Sperling is the champion; others show the round in which they were eliminated.

 Margaret Scriven (semifinals)
 Helen Jacobs (semifinals)
 Hilde Sperling (champion)
 Simonne Mathieu (finalist)
 Lolette Payot (quarterfinals)
 Kay Stammers (first round)
 Sylvie Henrotin (quarterfinals)
 Madzy Rollin Couquerque (quarterfinals)

Draw

Key
 Q = Qualifier
 WC = Wild card
 LL = Lucky loser
 r = Retired

Finals

Earlier rounds

Section 1

Section 2

Section 3

Section 4

References

External links
 

1935 in women's tennis
1935
1935 in French women's sport
1935 in French tennis